Cronan Balnae (died 692) was an Irish Saint.

Cronan Balnae (Cronan of Balla) appears to have been a successor of Mo Chua, who founded the monastery of Balla.

However, O Murail appears to identify him with Mo Chua himself.

His obituary appears in the Annals of the Four Masters.

References

 An Outline History of County Mayo by Nollaig O Muraile, p. 12, and A Mayo Miscellany by Bernard O'Hara, p. 243, in Mayo:Aspects of its Heritage, ed. Bernard O'Hara, 1982.

External links
http://www.ucc.ie/celt/published/T100005A/index.html

7th-century Irish abbots
Christian clergy from County Mayo
692 deaths
Year of birth unknown